Labeo fulakariensis is fish in genus Labeo from the Congo River.

References 

Labeo
Taxa named by Sinaseli-Marcel Tshibwabwa
Fish described in 2006
Endemic fauna of the Democratic Republic of the Congo